An Jeong-hwan (born 28 January 1984 in Daegu, South Korea) is a South Korean judoka.

He is a nephew of Olympic gold medalist Ahn Byeong-keun. At the age of 15, An moved to Japan and continued his judo career in Fukuoka. Upon graduation from Yamanashi Gakuin University in 2006, he came back to Korea and joined the Pohang City Hall judo club.

On August 26, 2009, An won the bronze medal in the -66 kg division at the 2009 World Judo Championships in Rotterdam, Netherlands.

References

External links
 

1984 births
Living people
Sportspeople from Daegu
South Korean male judoka
20th-century South Korean people
21st-century South Korean people